The Biathlon World Championships 2023 took place in Oberhof, Germany, from 8 to 19 February 2023.

Schedule
All times are local (UTC+1).

Medal summary

Medal table

Men

Women

Mixed

By athlete

References

External links
Official website

 
2023
2023 in biathlon
2023 in German sport
International sports competitions hosted by Germany
Biathlon competitions in Germany
February 2023 sports events in Germany